Travis Trickett (born May 29, 1985) is an American football coach. He is the former offensive coordinator at the University of South Florida. He has also coordinated offenses at Samford University, Florida Atlantic University, and Georgia State University.

Coaching career

Student/graduate assistant
Trickett's coaching career started as a student assistant at West Virginia under head coach Rich Rodriguez. While earning his degree, he with record setting quarterback Pat White.

Following his graduation in the spring of 2007, Trickett joined Nick Saban’s inaugural staff at Alabama as an offensive graduate assistant working closely with quarterbacks John Parker Wilson and Greg McElroy.

The following season, he moved on to joined Bobby Bowden’s staff at Florida State as an offensive graduate assistant from 2008 through 2010 working with the quarterbacks. During this time, Trickett helped mentor Christian Ponder and E. J. Manuel.

Samford
Trickett's first full-time coaching position was as the tight ends coach for Pat Sullivan and the Samford Bulldogs football team in 2011. The following season, offensive coordinator Rhett Lashlee departed for Arkansas State, and Trickett was promoted to offensive coordinator and quarterbacks coach. In his four seasons  as the play-caller (2012–2015), Trickett coached 23 all-conference players, led by 2013 Southern Conference player of the year, Andy Summerlin. He helped guide the Bulldogs to five straight winning seasons, a Southern Conference championship in 2013, and a berth in the 2013 NCAA Division I FCS football playoffs.

Florida Atlantic
In 2016, Trickett was hired as the new offensive coordinator at Florida Atlantic by Charlie Partridge. Though the owls only won three games, Trickett’s offense set FAU season records for rushing yards, yards per carry and rushing touchdowns, and the most yards in a game. Partridge was fired following the season, and Trickett wasn’t retained by the new staff.

Georgia State
After Shawn Elliott was hired as the new head coach at Georgia State, he hired Trickett as his new offensive coordinator and quarterback coach. In his first season with the Panthers, in 2017, Trickett helped guide them to a school record seven wins, including the schools first bowl win. His offense set new school marks for completion percentage and fewest interceptions in a season, along with the most total yards in a game and the most points against an FBS opponent. Quarterback Conner Manning and wide receiver Penny Hart earned All-Sun Belt Conference honors and Hart led the league with a school record 74 receptions.

The following year, Trickett’s quarterback, Dan Ellington, ranked number 14 in the nation with only five interceptions thrown (292 attempts). Hart was also named all-conference for a third season, and finished his career as the fourth-leading receiver in Sun Belt Conference history.

Return to West Virginia
Prior to the 2019 season, Trickett was hired by Neal Brown as the inside receivers and tight ends coach at West Virginia. During his time with the Mountaineers, Trickett guided inside receiver Winston Wright Jr. to two All-Big 12 selections as he led the team in receiving in both 2020 and 2021. Trickett also helped coach one of the most improved offenses in the nation. The Mountaineers added more than 90 yards per game from 2019 to 2020 as more than a touchdown per game.

In 2021, Trickett was ranked among the top ten recruiters in the Big 12 Conference by 247Sports, one of two outside of the Oklahoma and Texas staff’s. He is especially well-known for his recruiting efforts in the Miami, Florida area.

South Florida
In January of 2022, Trickett was announced as the new offensive coordinator for the South Florida Bulls football team. He replaced Charlie Weis Jr., whom took the same position at Ole Miss.

Personal life
Trickett is a Hattiesburg, Mississippi native. His father, Rick Trickett is currently the offensive line coach at Jacksonville State. His younger brother, Clint Trickett, is currently the offensive coordinator at Marshall, and his youngest brother, Chance, is a scout for the Los Angeles Rams.

Trickett and his wife, Tiffany, have three children: Maverick, Camilla, and Holden.

References

External links
 South Florida profile

1985 births
Living people
Alabama Crimson Tide football coaches
Florida Atlantic Owls football coaches
Florida State Seminoles football coaches
Georgia State Panthers football coaches
Samford Bulldogs football coaches
South Florida Bulls football coaches
West Virginia Mountaineers football coaches
Florida State University alumni
West Virginia University alumni
Sportspeople from Hattiesburg, Mississippi